

Nene Valley Conservation Park is a protected area in the Australian state of South Australia located in the localities of Blackfellows Caves and Nene Valley in the state's south-east about  south west of the municipal seat of Mount Gambier and about  west north west of Port MacDonnell.

The conservation park was proclaimed under the National Parks and Wildlife Act 1972 on 14 December 1972. In 1980, the following state of significance was published:
Nene Valley Conservation Park preserves an area of vegetation typical of sandy coasts in the south-east of South Australia. This vegetation complex has suffered through the effects of clearing and grazing throughout much of its former range.

The conservation park is classified as an IUCN Category III protected area.

References

External links
Nene Valley Conservation Park webpage on protected planet

Conservation parks of South Australia
Protected areas established in 1972
1972 establishments in Australia
Limestone Coast